Upper Broadheath is an area in the village of Lower Broadheath. It is not a separate village. Worcestershire, England.  It is in the Malvern Hills District and the civil parish of Lower Broadheath.

References

External links

Villages in Worcestershire